Vacoas-Phoenix also known as French: Villes Jumelles (Twin Cities), is a town in Mauritius, located in the Plaines Wilhems District, the eastern part also lies in the Moka District. The town is administered by the Municipal Council of Vacoas-Phoenix. The town lies between Quatre Bornes and Curepipe.

History
The towns of Vacoas and Phoenix fused in 1963. Vacoas-Phoenix fully became a municipality in 1968.

Politics
For the general elections the town is classified as the No 15 constituency known as La Caverne and Phoenix and the No 16 Vacoas and Floreal constituency.

Sports
The football team of the town is the AS de Vacoas-Phoenix, they play in the Mauritian League, the top division in Mauritian football.

The town hosted the official 2017 FIBA Under-16 African Championship.

Sub-locality
The town of Vacoas-Phoenix is divided into different suburbs.

 Belle-Terre
 Camp Fouquereaux
 Castel
 Cinq Arpents
 Clairfonds
 Glen Park
 Henrietta
 Hermitage
 Highlands
 Hollyrood
 La Caverne Village
 La Marie
 Mesnil
 Phoenix
 Quinze Cantons
 Réunion
 Sadally
 Solférino
 St-Paul
 Visitation
 Vacoas

Government
Mauritius Qualifications Authority is headquartered in this town.

Twin towns – sister cities
Vacoas-Phoenix is twinned with:
 Antsirabe, Madagascar
 Nantong, China
 Pune, India
 Sainte-Suzanne, Réunion, France

Geography

Climate

See also

 List of places in Mauritius
Phoenix Beverages, is the largest brewery of the island and is located in Phoenix

References 

 
Plaines Wilhems District
Moka District